Granger High School may refer to any of several high schools in the United States:

Granger High School (Granger, Texas)
Granger High School (Granger, Washington)
Granger High School (Utah)

See also
Grainger High School, in Rutledge, Tennessee